The Kunstmuseum Solothurn or Art Museum Solothurn is an art museum in the Swiss town Solothurn.

History
The museum opened in 1902. The early exposition showed the town's collections of arts, historical artifacts and natural historical objects. Around 1980, the natural history collection was moved to the Naturmuseum Solothurn, the museumsbuilding was converted and since then exhibits art from various collections along with short-period exhibitions of contemporary art.

Collection

The collection has five divisions: old masters, Swiss landscapes from the 18th until the 20th century, Swiss contemporary art, and two separate collections from gifts from collectors; the Dûbi-Müller and Josef-Müller collection, focused on international atr from the late 19th and early 20th century, and a collection of works by Max Gubler. 

Highlights of the collection of old masters include a "Madonna of the Strawberries" from 1425, the Solothurner Madonna by Hans Holbein the Younger, and works by Frans Snyders and Jusepe de Ribera. Swiss masters included in the landscape collection are Caspar Wolf, Alexandre Calame, Félix Vallotton, Giovanni Giacometti and local artist Otto Frölicher. Modern Swiss artists include Jean Tinguely, Méret Oppenheim and Bernhard Luginbühl. The contemporary collection includes works by Daniel Spoerri, Dieter Roth, Markus Raetz, Roman Signer, Silvie Defraoui, René Zäch, Albrecht Schnider, Uwe Wittwer, Felix Stephan Huber, Ian Anüll, Peter Wüthrich, Ingo Giezendanner, Robert Estermann. 

The double collection of the sisters Müller contains paintings by Vincent van Gogh, Gustav Klimt, Paul Cézanne, Henri Matisse, Edgar Degas, Auguste Renoir, Fernand Léger, and Swiss painter Ferdinand Hodler.

External links

  

Art museums and galleries in Switzerland
Solothurn
Museums in the canton of Solothurn
1902 establishments in Switzerland
Museums established in 1902